This is a list of adverse effects of the anti-cancer drug axitinib, sorted by frequency of occurrence.

Very common
Very common (>10% incidence) adverse effects include:

 Underactive thyroid
 Decreased appetite
 Headache
 Dizziness
 Taste changes
 Haemorrhage
 High blood pressure
 Cough
 Shortness of breath
 Speech disorder
 Diarrhoea
 Nausea
 Vomiting
 Abdominal pain
 Stomatitis
 Indigestion
 Hand-foot syndrome
 Dry skin
 Rash
 Joint aches and pains
 Pain in the extremities
 Proteinuria
 Fatigue
 Asthenia
 Mucosal inflammation
 Weight loss

Common
Common (1–10% incidence) adverse effects include:

 Anaemia
 Thrombocytopenia
 Hyperthyroidism
 TSH-increased
 Dehydration
 High blood potassium
 High blood calcium
 Ringing in the ears
 Venous embolic and thrombotic events
 Arterial embolic and thrombotic events
 Oropharyngeal pain
 Flatulence
 Haemorrhoids
 Glossodynia
 Hyperbilirubinaemia
 Itchiness
 Erythema
 Hair loss
 Myalgia
 Kidney failure
 Increased lipase
 Increases alanine aminotransferase
 Increased amylase
 Increased aspartate aminotransferase
 Increased alkaline phosphatase
 Increased creatinine

Uncommon
Uncommon (0.1–1% incidence) adverse effects include:
 Gastrointestinal Perforation and fistula
 Reversible posterior leucoencephalopathy syndrome
 Polycythaemia

References

Axitinib